Potholes is a 1928 Soviet silent romantic drama directed by Abram Room.

The film's art direction was done by Viktor Aden.

Synopsis
The setting of the film is a glass factory. Glassblower Paul and the grinder Tanya fall in love and become husband and wife. At the factory, downsizing is happening and Tanya gets dismissed. She does not look for another job, deciding to devote himself to the family and the child. Meanwhile, Paul begins to have romantic relations with his co-worker Lisa and even leaves his family for her. Tanya finds a job at a factory in another city. On the boat, she meets Paul. Deciding to leave his past behind and start a new life he also transferred to another plant. The meeting ends with the reconciliation of the spouses.

Cast
 Sergei Minin 
 Evlaliya Olgina

References

Bibliography 
 Christie, Ian & Taylor, Richard. The Film Factory: Russian and Soviet Cinema in Documents 1896-1939. Routledge, 2012.

External links 
 

1928 films
Soviet romantic drama films
Soviet silent films
1920s Russian-language films
Films directed by Abram Room
Russian romantic drama films
Soviet black-and-white films
1928 romantic drama films
Russian black-and-white films
Silent romantic drama films